Various motor vessels have had the name Juno, including:

 , a Norwegian general cargo/container ship launched as MV Amazonia and later named MV Rainbow Hope and currently MV Geysir.

See also
 

Ship names